The Glasgow and South Western Railway (GSWR) 40 class is a class of ten 2-2-2 steam locomotives designed in 1860, a development of the 2 class intended for express passenger duties.

Development 
This was the second class to be built at the new Kilmarnock Locomotive Works, in two batches. The first six locomotives numbered 40, 39, 27, 10, 43 and 42 (Works Nos. 14–19) were built between 1860 and January 1862. A further four locomotives, numbered 28–9, 31 and 44 were built in 1864 (Works Nos. 26–29).
The  members of the class were fitted with domeless boilers. They were originally built without cabs, but several later had them fitted. Two members of the class were fitted with Giffard injectors.

Withdrawal 
The class were withdrawn by James Stirling and Hugh Smellie between 1876 and 1881.

References 

040
2-2-2 locomotives
Standard gauge steam locomotives of Great Britain
Railway locomotives introduced in 1860
Scrapped locomotives